This page lists all described species of the spider family Trachelidae accepted by the World Spider Catalog :

A

Afroceto

Afroceto Lyle & Haddad, 2010
 A. africana (Simon, 1910) — Namibia, South Africa, Lesotho
 A. ansieae Lyle, 2015 — South Africa
 A. bisulca Lyle & Haddad, 2010 — South Africa
 A. bulla Lyle & Haddad, 2010 — South Africa
 A. capensis Lyle & Haddad, 2010 — South Africa
 A. coenosa (Simon, 1897) — South Africa
 A. corcula Lyle & Haddad, 2010 — South Africa
 A. croeseri Lyle & Haddad, 2010 — South Africa
 A. dippenaarae Lyle, 2015 — South Africa
 A. flabella Lyle & Haddad, 2010 — South Africa
 A. gracilis Lyle & Haddad, 2010 — South Africa
 A. martini (Simon, 1897) (type) — East, Southern Africa
 A. plana Lyle & Haddad, 2010 — South Africa, Malawi
 A. porrecta Lyle & Haddad, 2010 — South Africa
 A. rotunda Lyle & Haddad, 2010 — South Africa
 A. spicula Lyle & Haddad, 2010 — South Africa

C

Cetonana

Cetonana Strand, 1929
 C. laticeps (Canestrini, 1868) (type) — Europe, Russia (Caucasus)
 C. petrunkevitchi Mello-Leitão, 1945 — Brazil
 C. shaanxiensis Jin, Yin & Zhang, 2017 — China

F

Fuchiba

Fuchiba Haddad & Lyle, 2008
 F. aquilonia Haddad & Lyle, 2008 (type) — Botswana, Mozambique, South Africa
 F. capensis Haddad & Lyle, 2008 — South Africa
 F. montana Haddad & Lyle, 2008 — South Africa, Lesotho
 F. similis Haddad & Lyle, 2008 — South Africa
 F. tortilis Haddad & Lyle, 2008 — South Africa
 F. venteri Haddad & Lyle, 2008 — South Africa

Fuchibotulus

Fuchibotulus Haddad & Lyle, 2008
 F. bicornis Haddad & Lyle, 2008 (type) — South Africa
 F. haddadi Lyle, 2013 — South Africa
 F. kigelia Haddad & Lyle, 2008 — South Africa, Mozambique

J

Jocquestus

Jocquestus Lyle & Haddad, 2018
 J. capensis Lyle & Haddad, 2018 — South Africa
 J. griswoldi Lyle & Haddad, 2018 — Tanzania
 J. harrisi Lyle & Haddad, 2018 — South Africa
 J. incurvus Lyle & Haddad, 2018 — South Africa
 J. obliquus Lyle & Haddad, 2018 — Tanzania
 J. roeweri (Lawrence, 1938) — South Africa
 J. schenkeli (Lessert, 1923) (type) — D.R. Congo, Zimbabwe, Mozambique, South Africa, Angola?

M

Meriola

Meriola Banks, 1895
 M. arcifera (Simon, 1886) — Bolivia, Brazil, Uruguay, Chile, Argentina. Introduced to Easter Is. and Robinson Crusoe Is. (Chile), USA (California, Hawaii)
 M. avalosi Gonzáles Márquez, Grismado & Ramírez, 2021 — Argentina
 M. balcarce Platnick & Ewing, 1995 — Argentina
 M. californica (Banks, 1904) — USA, Mexico
 M. cetiformis (Strand, 1908) — Peru, Bolivia, Brazil, Uruguay, Chile, Argentina
 M. davidi Grismado, 2004 — Argentina
 M. decepta Banks, 1895 (type) — Canada, USA, Mexico, Guatemala, Colombia, Ecuador, Peru, Brazil
 M. fasciata (Mello-Leitão, 1941) — Brazil, Uruguay, Argentina
 M. foraminosa (Keyserling, 1891) — Venezuela, Ecuador, Peru, Brazil, Chile, Argentina
 M. gallina Platnick & Ewing, 1995 — Chile
 M. goloboffi Platnick & Ewing, 1995 — Chile, Argentina
 M. lineolata (Mello-Leitão, 1941) — Brazil, Argentina
 M. longitarsis (Simon, 1904) — Chile, Argentina
 M. macrocephala (Nicolet, 1849) — Chile
 M. manuel Platnick & Ewing, 1995 — Chile
 M. mauryi Platnick & Ewing, 1995 — Brazil, Argentina
 M. nague Platnick & Ewing, 1995 — Chile
 M. penai Platnick & Ewing, 1995 — Chile, Argentina
 M. peras Gonzáles Márquez, Grismado & Ramírez, 2021 — Argentina
 M. puyehue Platnick & Ewing, 1995 — Chile, Argentina
 M. quilicura Platnick & Ewing, 1995 — Chile, Argentina
 M. rahue Platnick & Ewing, 1995 — Chile, Argentina
 M. ramirezi Platnick & Ewing, 1995 — Argentina
 M. setosa (Simon, 1897) — Brazil, Uruguay, Argentina
 M. tablas Platnick & Ewing, 1995 — Chile, Argentina
 M. teresita Platnick & Ewing, 1995 — Brazil, Uruguay, Argentina
 M. virgata (Simon, 1904) — Chile

Metatrachelas

Metatrachelas Bosselaers & Bosmans, 2010
 M. amabilis (Simon, 1878) — Algeria, Tunisia
 M. macrochelis (Wunderlich, 1992) — Spain, Canary Is., Azores, Algeria
 M. rayi (Simon, 1878) (type) — Portugal, Spain, France, Italy, Albania, Bulgaria, Algeria

O

Orthobula

Orthobula Simon, 1897
 O. bilobata Deeleman-Reinhold, 2001 — Indonesia (Sumatra, Borneo, Lesser Sunda Is.)
 O. calceata Simon, 1897 — Sierra Leone
 O. charitonovi (Mikhailov, 1986) — Eastern Mediterranean to Central Asia
 O. chayuensis Yang, Song & Zhu, 2003 — China
 O. crucifera Bösenberg & Strand, 1906 — China, Korea, Japan
 O. impressa Simon, 1897 (type) — India, Sri Lanka, Seychelles, Reunion
 O. infima Simon, 1896 — South Africa
 O. milloti Caporiacco, 1949 — Kenya
 O. puncta Yang, Song & Zhu, 2003 — China
 O. pura Deeleman-Reinhold, 2001 — Indonesia (Sulawesi)
 O. qinghaiensis Hu, 2001 — China
 O. quadrinotata Deeleman-Reinhold, 2001 — Indonesia (Sulawesi)
 O. radiata Simon, 1897 — South Africa
 O. sicca Simon, 1903 — Madagascar
 O. spiniformis Tso, Zhu, Zhang & Zhang, 2005 — Taiwan
 O. tibenensis Hu, 2001 — China
 O. trinotata Simon, 1896 — Philippines
 O. yaginumai Platnick, 1977 — China
 O. zhangmuensis Hu & Li, 1987 — China

P

Paccius

Paccius Simon, 1898
 P. angulatus Platnick, 2000 — Madagascar
 P. elevatus Platnick, 2000 — Madagascar
 P. griswoldi Platnick, 2000 — Madagascar
 P. madagascariensis (Simon, 1889) (type) — Madagascar
 P. mucronatus Simon, 1898 — Madagascar
 P. quadridentatus Simon, 1898 — Seychelles
 P. quinteri Platnick, 2000 — Madagascar
 P. scharffi Platnick, 2000 — Madagascar

Paraceto

Paraceto Jin, Yin & Zhang, 2017
 P. orientalis (Schenkel, 1936) — China, Korea
 P. spiralis Jin, Yin & Zhang, 2017 (type) — China

Paratrachelas

Paratrachelas Kovblyuk & Nadolny, 2009
 P. acuminus (Zhu & An, 1988) — Russia (Far East), China, Korea
 P. atlantis Bosselaers & Bosmans, 2010 — Algeria
 P. ibericus (Bosselaers, Urones, Barrientos & Alberdi, 2009) — Portugal, Spain, France, Algeria
 P. maculatus (Thorell, 1875) (type) — France to Ukraine, Turkey, Israel
 P. validus (Simon, 1884) — Portugal, Spain, Italy

Patelloceto

Patelloceto Lyle & Haddad, 2010
 P. denticulata Lyle & Haddad, 2010 — Ethiopia
 P. media Lyle & Haddad, 2010 — Central, East Africa
 P. secutor Lyle & Haddad, 2010 (type) — Southern Africa

Planochelas

Planochelas Lyle & Haddad, 2009
 P. botulus Lyle & Haddad, 2009 (type) — Ghana, Uganda
 P. brevis Khoza & Lyle, 2019 — DR Congo
 P. dentatus Lyle & Haddad, 2009 — Ivory Coast
 P. haddadi Khoza & Lyle, 2019 — South Africa
 P. jocquei Khoza & Lyle, 2019 — DR Congo
 P. neethlingi Khoza & Lyle, 2019 — South Africa
 P. purpureus Lyle & Haddad, 2009 — Ivory Coast

Poachelas

Poachelas Haddad & Lyle, 2008
 P. montanus Haddad & Lyle, 2008 — South Africa
 P. refugus Haddad, 2010 — South Africa
 P. solitarius Haddad & Lyle, 2008 — Zimbabwe
 P. striatus Haddad & Lyle, 2008 (type) — South Africa

S

Spinotrachelas

Spinotrachelas Haddad, 2006
 S. capensis Haddad, 2006 (type) — South Africa
 S. confinis Lyle, 2011 — South Africa
 S. montanus Haddad, Neethling & Lyle, 2011 — South Africa
 S. namaquensis Lyle, 2011 — South Africa
 S. similis Lyle, 2011 — South Africa

T

Thysanina

Thysanina Simon, 1910
 T. absolvo Lyle & Haddad, 2006 — South Africa
 T. capensis Lyle & Haddad, 2006 — South Africa
 T. gracilis Lyle & Haddad, 2006 — Namibia, South Africa
 T. serica Simon, 1910 (type) — Namibia, South Africa
 T. similis Lyle & Haddad, 2006 — Tanzania
 T. transversa Lyle & Haddad, 2006 — South Africa

Trachelas

Trachelas L. Koch, 1872
 T. alticola Hu, 2001 — China
 T. anomalus (Taczanowski, 1874) — French Guiana
 T. barroanus Chamberlin, 1925 — Panama
 T. bicolor Keyserling, 1887 — Hispaniola
 T. bispinosus F. O. Pickard-Cambridge, 1899 — Mexico to Panama, Trinidad
 T. borinquensis Gertsch, 1942 — Puerto Rico
 T. brachialis Jin, Yin & Zhang, 2017 — China
 T. bravidus Chickering, 1972 — Jamaica
 T. bulbosus F. O. Pickard-Cambridge, 1899 — Mexico to El Salvador
 T. cadulus Chickering, 1972 — Jamaica
 T. cambridgei Kraus, 1955 — El Salvador to Panama
 T. canariensis Wunderlich, 1987 — Spain, Canary Is., Africa
 T. chamoli Quasin, Siliwal & Uniyal, 2018 — India
 T. chubbi Lessert, 1921 — East Africa
 T. contractus Platnick & Shadab, 1974 — Cuba
 T. costatus O. Pickard-Cambridge, 1885 — Pakistan, India
 T. crassus Rivera-Quiroz & Álvarez-Padilla, 2015 — Mexico
 T. crewsae Marusik & Fomichev, 2020 — Tajikistan
 T. daubei Schmidt, 1971 — Ecuador
 T. depressus Platnick & Shadab, 1974 — Mexico
 T. devi Biswas & Raychaudhuri, 2000 — Bangladesh
 T. digitus Platnick & Shadab, 1974 — Costa Rica
 T. dilatus Platnick & Shadab, 1974 — Hispaniola
 T. ductonuda Rivera-Quiroz & Álvarez-Padilla, 2015 — Mexico
 T. ecudobus Chickering, 1972 — Panama, Trinidad
 T. erectus Platnick & Shadab, 1974 — Hispaniola
 T. fanjingshan Zhang, Fu & Zhu, 2009 — China
 T. fasciae Zhang, Fu & Zhu, 2009 — China
 T. femoralis Simon, 1898 — St. Vincent
 T. fuscus Platnick & Shadab, 1974 — Mexico
 T. gaoligongensis Jin, Yin & Zhang, 2017 — China
 T. giganteus Platnick & Shadab, 1974 — Jamaica
 T. gigapophysis Jin, Yin & Zhang, 2017 — China
 T. hamatus Platnick & Shadab, 1974 — Mexico
 T. hassleri Gertsch, 1942 — Guyana
 T. himalayensis Biswas, 1993 — India
 T. huachucanus Gertsch, 1942 — USA, Mexico
 T. inclinatus Platnick & Shadab, 1974 — Cuba
 T. jamaicensis Gertsch, 1942 — Jamaica
 T. japonicus Bösenberg & Strand, 1906 — Russia (Far East), China, Korea, Japan
 T. lanceolatus F. O. Pickard-Cambridge, 1899 — Mexico
 T. latus Platnick & Shadab, 1974 — Mexico, Guatemala
 T. mexicanus Banks, 1898 — USA, Mexico
 T. minor O. Pickard-Cambridge, 1872 (type) — Mediterranean to Central Asia, West Africa
 T. mombachensis Leister & Miller, 2015 — Nicaragua
 T. mulcetus Chickering, 1972 — Jamaica
 T. nanyueensis Yin, 2012 — China
 T. niger Mello-Leitão, 1922 — Brazil
 T. nigrifemur Mello-Leitão, 1941 — Colombia
 T. oculus Platnick & Shadab, 1974 — Cuba
 T. odoreus Rivera-Quiroz & Álvarez-Padilla, 2015 — Mexico
 T. oreophilus Simon, 1906 — India, Sri Lanka
 T. organatus Platnick & Shadab, 1974 — USA, Mexico
 T. pacificus Chamberlin & Ivie, 1935 — USA, Mexico
 T. panamanus Chickering, 1937 — Panama
 T. parallelus Platnick & Shadab, 1974 — Nicaragua
 T. planus Platnick & Shadab, 1974 — Costa Rica
 T. prominens Platnick & Shadab, 1974 — Mexico to Panama
 T. punctatus Simon, 1886 — Senegal
 T. pusillus Lessert, 1923 — South Africa, Lesotho
 T. quadridens Kraus, 1955 — El Salvador, Costa Rica
 T. quisquiliarum Simon, 1906 — Sri Lanka
 T. robustus Keyserling, 1891 — Brazil
 T. rotundus Platnick & Shadab, 1974 — Mexico
 T. rugosus Keyserling, 1891 — Brazil
 T. santaemartae Schmidt, 1971 — Colombia
 T. scopulifer Simon, 1896 — South Africa
 T. shilinensis Jin, Yin & Zhang, 2017 — China
 T. similis F. O. Pickard-Cambridge, 1899 — USA to Costa Rica
 T. sinensis Chen, Peng & Zhao, 1995 — China
 T. sinuosus Platnick & Shadab, 1974 — USA
 T. speciosus Banks, 1898 — Mexico
 T. spicus Platnick & Shadab, 1974 — Mexico
 T. spinulatus F. O. Pickard-Cambridge, 1899 — Central America
 T. spirifer F. O. Pickard-Cambridge, 1899 — Guatemala, Honduras
 T. submissus Gertsch, 1942 — Paraguay
 T. sylvae Caporiacco, 1949 — Kenya
 T. tanasevitchi Marusik & Kovblyuk, 2010 — Russia (Far East)
 T. tomaculus Platnick & Shadab, 1974 — Cuba, Hispaniola
 T. tranquillus (Hentz, 1847) — USA, Canada
 T. transversus F. O. Pickard-Cambridge, 1899 — Mexico, Costa Rica
 T. triangulus Platnick & Shadab, 1974 — Panama
 T. tridentatus Mello-Leitão, 1947 — Brazil
 T. trifidus Platnick & Shadab, 1974 — Panama
 T. truncatulus F. O. Pickard-Cambridge, 1899 — Mexico
 T. uniaculeatus Schmidt, 1956 — Canary Is.
 T. vitiosus Keyserling, 1891 — Brazil
 T. volutus Gertsch, 1935 — USA, Mexico
 T. vulcani Simon, 1896 — China, Japan, Indonesia (Java, Moluccas)
 T. zhui Li, Wang, Zhang & Chen, 2019 — China
 † T. poinari Penney, 2001

Trachelopachys

Trachelopachys Simon, 1897
 T. aemulatus Gertsch, 1942 — Paraguay
 T. ammobates Platnick & Rocha, 1995 — Brazil
 T. bicolor Chamberlin, 1916 — Peru, Bolivia
 T. bidentatus Tullgren, 1905 — Bolivia
 T. camarapi Pantoja, Saturnino & Bonaldo, 2021 — Brazil
 T. caviunae (Mello-Leitão, 1947) — Brazil
 T. cingulipes (Simon, 1886) — Argentina
 T. gracilis (Keyserling, 1891) — Brazil
 T. ignacio Platnick, 1975 — Paraguay
 T. keyserlingi (Roewer, 1951) — Brazil, Paraguay, Argentina
 T. machupicchu Platnick, 1975 — Peru
 T. magdalena Platnick, 1975 — Colombia
 T. quadriocellatus (Mello-Leitão, 1939) — Bolivia, Paraguay, Argentina
 T. sericeus (Simon, 1886) (type) — Brazil, Paraguay, Argentina, Chile
 T. singularis (Caporiacco, 1955) — Venezuela
 T. tarma Platnick, 1975 — Peru

U

Utivarachna

Utivarachna Kishida, 1940
 U. accentuata (Simon, 1896) — Sri Lanka
 U. arcuata Zhao & Peng, 2014 — China
 U. bucculenta Deeleman-Reinhold, 2001 — Thailand
 U. chamaeleon Deeleman-Reinhold, 2001 — Borneo (Malaysia, Indonesia)
 U. dusun Deeleman-Reinhold, 2001 — Malaysia (Borneo)
 U. fabaria Zhao & Peng, 2014 — China
 U. fronto (Simon, 1906) — India
 U. fukasawana Kishida, 1940 (type) — Borneo (Malaysia, Brunei)
 U. gongshanensis Zhao & Peng, 2014 — China
 U. gui (Zhu, Song & Kim, 1998) — China
 U. ichneumon Deeleman-Reinhold, 2001 — Malaysia (Borneo)
 U. kinabaluensis Deeleman-Reinhold, 2001 — Malaysia (Borneo)
 U. lata Jin, Yin & Zhang, 2015 — China
 U. phyllicola Deeleman-Reinhold, 2001 — Thailand, Indonesia (Sumatra, Borneo)
 U. rama Chami-Kranon & Likhitrakarn, 2007 — Thailand
 U. rubra Deeleman-Reinhold, 2001 — Indonesia (Borneo)
 U. subfabaria Liu, Xu & Haddad, 2020 — China
 U. taiwanica (Hayashi & Yoshida, 1993) — Taiwan
 U. tangi Liu, Xu & Haddad, 2020 — China

References

Trachelidae